First-seeded Ellsworth Vines defeated first foreign seeded Henri Cochet 6–4, 6–4, 6–4 in the final to win the men's singles tennis title at the 1932 U.S. National Championships.

Seeds
The tournament used two lists of eight players for seeding the men's singles event; one for U.S. players and one for foreign players. Ellsworth Vines is the champion; others show the round in which they were eliminated.

  Ellsworth Vines (champion)
  Wilmer Allison (semifinals)
  Frank Shields (quarterfinals)
  George Lott (quarterfinals)
  Sidney Wood (quarterfinals)
  Clifford Sutter (semifinals)
  John Van Ryn (fourth round)
  Gregory Mangin (fourth round)

  Henri Cochet (finalist)
  Bunny Austin (fourth round)
  Fred Perry (fourth round)
  Jiro Satoh (second round)
  Takeo Kuwabara (fourth round)
  Marcel Bernard (third round)
  John Olliff (fourth round)
  Edward Avory (fourth round)

Draw

Finals

References

Men's singles
1932